XHENU-FM (branded as La Rancherita) are radio stations broadcasting on 101.9 MHz that serve the Laredo, Texas, United States and Nuevo Laredo, Tamaulipas, Mexico border area.

History

XENU-AM received its concession on July 15, 1957. It was owned by Miguel Villarreal Ibarra and transferred to XENU Radio, S.A. in 1968. XENU remained a daytimer until beginning nighttime service in 2003 under Radiorama ownership.

In 2018, XENU-AM migrated to FM on 101.9 MHz as XHENU-FM.

External links

References

1957 establishments in Mexico
Radio stations established in 1957
Radio stations in Laredo, Texas
Radio stations in Nuevo Laredo
Regional Mexican radio stations
Spanish-language radio stations